Amongst Friends is the soundtrack to the 1993 film, Amongst Friends. It was released on August 31, 1993, through Atlantic Records and consisted of a blend of alternative rock and hip hop.

Track listing
"Innocent Child"- 6:00 (Big Audio Dynamite)  
"It's a Shame About Ray"- 3:07 (The Lemonheads) 
"Passin' Me By"- 5:04 (The Pharcyde) 
"Kid's Alright"- 4:20 (Bettie Serveert) 
"Wild Thing"- 4:24 (Tone Lōc)  
"Crawl"- 4:25 (Sweet Band) 
"Brooklyn"- 4:04 (MC Lyte)  
"All the Young Dudes"- 3:30 (Mott the Hoople)  
"Confusion"- 4:24 (Act of Mercy)  
"Da Hood"- 3:56 (Da Youngstas) 
"Train Going Backwards"- 6:17 (Dramarama) 
"Long Island"- 5:10 (Mick Jones)  
"No Ennio"- 5:09 (Mick Jones) 
"I Don't Know"- 5:28 (Mick Jones)

References

Crime film soundtracks
Hip hop soundtracks
1993 soundtrack albums
Atlantic Records soundtracks